Clark County Museum is located in Henderson, Nevada and is owned and operated by Clark County.  The museum includes the Anna Roberts Parks Exhibit Hall and Heritage Street which contains eight historic buildings from the county.

The museum focuses on the history of the southernmost county in Nevada with emphasis on the early Native American inhabitants such as the Paiute people, as well as mining, the impact of the railroads, and gaming.  Exhibits include several historic houses as well as a recreated ghost town.

History 
In 1911, Anna Nuhfer Roberts came to Nevada with her husband, William Roberts. He was the first mortician in Las Vegas, and together they travelled across southern Nevada while also conducting business. During this time, Anna became a collector of historical artifacts, minerals, and clothing.

In the mid-1920s, William and Anna's marriage ended. William moved to California. However, Anna remained in Nevada with her daughter, Edith Jennings Mariano, born in 1920, and her widowed mother. During this time, Anna worked as a mortician since she had completed undertaker training and was licensed in both Nevada and California. She continued to travel throughout southern Nevada as a mortician, while continuing to add to her collections.

In May 1926, she opened Palm Mortuary in Las Vegas and, shortly after, married Gene Parks. She assumed her husband's last name and become known as Anna Roberts Parks. She initially stored her burgeoning collection inside her home or scattered about her five-acre property. As her collection outgrew her own property, much of it was moved to an army building near 21st and Fremont Streets. This location proved less satisfactory since people broke in and stole valuable and historic artifacts.

In 1962, Anna Roberts Parks died in a car crash, leaving her collections and property to her only daughter, Edith. Edith sought a local sponsor to create a museum for her mother's collection and keep the collection in southern Nevada. After another break-in at the army building,  a local Nevada historian, Maryellen Vallier Sadovich contacted Edith and bolstered the search for a sponsor.  Maryellen brought the collection to the attention of Dick Pryor, a member of the Henderson Chamber of Commerce.  The Henderson Chamber of Commerce was interested, but like other potential sponsors, they expressed their uncertainty over where to house the collection and how to raise sufficient money to build a proper museum building.  In response to Maryellen's letter dated June 11, 1966, the Chamber announced the creation of a permanent committee to study the problem.  The initial three committee members were Frank Schreck, Glen Taylor, and Dick Pryor.  By January 1968, the Chamber of Commerce voted to go ahead with the plans for a museum building, but they had been told previously that the Henderson school facilities were not an option.  About that same time, Maryellen Sadovich called to report that the collections had been vandalized yet again from their storage location, primarily in the army barracks building at 21st and Fremont Street.  This prompted a call to Glen Taylor, a member of the school board.  Within an hour, Glen secured the Townsite school's gymnasium on Water Street for the project.  There were months of cautious obstructions and objections about using school property for the museum.

In light of these developments, Dick Pryor, Maryellen Sadovich, Glen Taylor, and Ellen Shirley-Frehner immediately drove to Las Vegas to supervise moving the collection from the army barracks to the school gymnasium in Henderson.  By January 11, 1968, the move was complete and the collection was secured in the school gymnasium, awaiting a good cleaning, organization, and preparation for display.

The new museum became a community project for the close-knit community of Henderson.  To properly structure the new museum, by-laws were drawn up by District Judge Jim Santini.  Bill Boyd drew up a contract that legally transferred the collections from Mrs. Jennings to the Chamber of Commerce.  The new museum became a legal entity on March 19, 1968.  The name was later changed to the Southern Nevada Museum.

Later, the museum's name changed to Clark County Museum or Clark County Heritage Museum, by which it is currently known. The administrator of the Clark County Heritage Museum is Mark Hall-Patton, a 20th-century historian who has been featured on the reality television series Pawn Stars as a recurring expert.

Exhibits

Gaming 
 1898 Dewy slot machine

Historic houses  
 Original Henderson B.M.I. townsite house circa 1941 to 1944
 Giles/Barcus House (circa 1905 from Goldfield, Nevada)
 Beckley House (1912 from Las Vegas, Nevada)
 Goumond House from 1935 and restored in the 1950s.
 Beckley House built in 1912, and renovated in the 1920s
 Babcock and Wilcox House from the 1930s
 Townsite House from the 1940s

The Candlelight Wedding Chapel, previously located on the Strip, is now housed on the Museum grounds, at the end of Heritage Street. A historic railroad cottage from downtown Las Vegas has also been relocated to the Museum grounds, but is not yet open to the public. One can look inside at period furnishings from the porch.

Transportation 
 1932 Boulder City train depot
 1946 Plymouth Coupe
 Gourmond House (1930s)
 1959 Studebaker Lark

References

External links
 Clark County Museum - official site at Clark County Parks & Recreation

Buildings and structures in Henderson, Nevada
Museums in the Las Vegas Valley
Open-air museums in Nevada
History museums in Nevada
Mining museums in Nevada
Native American museums in Nevada
Historic house museums in Nevada